Jefferson County is a county located in the U.S. state of Ohio. As of the 2020 census, the population was 65,249. Its county seat is Steubenville. The county is named for Thomas Jefferson, who was vice president at the time of its creation.

Jefferson County is part of the Weirton–Steubenville, WV–OH Metropolitan Statistical Area, which is also included in the Pittsburgh–New Castle–Weirton, PA–WV–OH Combined Statistical Area.

History
Jefferson County was organized on July 29, 1797, by proclamation of Governor Arthur St. Clair, six years before Ohio was granted statehood. Its boundaries were originally quite large, including all of northeastern Ohio east of the Cuyahoga River, but it was divided and redrawn several times before assuming its present-day boundaries in 1833, after the formation of neighboring Carroll County.

In 1786, the United States built Fort Steuben to protect the government surveyors mapping the land west of the Ohio River. When the surveyors completed their task a few years later, the fort was abandoned. In the meantime, settlers had built homes around the fort; they named their settlement La Belle. When the county was created in 1797, La Belle was selected as the County seat. The town was subsequently renamed Steubenville, in honor of the abandoned fort.

During the first half of the 19th century, Steubenville was primarily a port town, and the rest of the county consisted of small villages and farms. However, in 1856, Frazier, Kilgore and Company erected a rolling mill (the forerunner of steel mills) and the Steubenville Coal and Mining Company sank a coal shaft, resulting in Jefferson County becoming one of the leading centers of the new Industrial Revolution.

Geography

Adjacent counties
 Columbiana County (north)
 Hancock County, West Virginia (northeast)
 Brooke County, West Virginia (east)
 Ohio County, West Virginia (southeast)
 Belmont County (south)
 Harrison County (southwest)
 Carroll County (northwest)

Major highways

Demographics

2000 census
As of the census of 2000, there were 73,894 people, 30,417 households, and 20,592 families living in the county. The population density was 180 people per square mile (70/km2). There were 33,291 housing units at an average density of 81 per square mile (31/km2). The racial makeup of the county was 92.49% White, 5.68% Black or African American, 0.20% Native American, 0.33% Asian, 0.02% Pacific Islander, 0.25% from other races, and 1.03% from two or more races. 0.62% of the population were Hispanic or Latino of any race. 96.5% spoke English, 1.1% Spanish and 1.0% Italian as their first language.

There were 30,417 households, out of which 26.70% had children under the age of 18 living with them, 52.30% were married couples living together, 11.60% had a female householder with no husband present, and 32.30% were non-families. 28.50% of all households were made up of individuals, and 14.40% had someone living alone who was 65 years of age or older. The average household size was 2.36 and the average family size was 2.88.

In the county, the population was spread out, with 21.40% under the age of 18, 8.50% from 18 to 24, 25.60% from 25 to 44, 25.90% from 45 to 64, and 18.60% who were 65 years of age or older. The median age was 42 years. For every 100 females there were 91.20 males. For every 100 females age 18 and over, there were 87.50 males.

The median income for a household in the county was $30,853, and the median income for a family was $38,807. Males had a median income of $35,785 versus $20,375 for females. The per capita income for the county was $16,476. About 11.40% of families and 15.10% of the population were below the poverty line, including 22.30% of those under age 18 and 8.90% of those age 65 or over.

2010 census
As of the 2010 United States Census, there were 69,709 people, 29,109 households, and 18,713 families living in the county. The racial makeup of the county was 91.9% white, 5.6% black or African American, 0.4% Asian, 0.1% American Indian, 0.2% from other races, and 1.7% from two or more races. Those of Hispanic or Latino origin made up 1.1% of the population. In terms of ancestry, 20.0% were German, 17.1% were Irish, 12.9% were Italian, 9.1% were English, 8.3% were Polish, and 4.6% were American.

Of the 29,109 households, 26.4% had children under the age of 18 living with them, 47.0% were married couples living together, 12.4% had a female householder with no husband present, 35.7% were non-families, and 30.5% of all households were made up of individuals. The average household size was 2.32 and the average family size was 2.86. The median age was 43.9 years.

The median income for a household in the county was $37,527 and the median income for a family was $47,901. Males had a median income of $43,601 versus $27,965 for females. The per capita income for the county was $20,470. About 12.4% of families and 17.7% of the population were below the poverty line, including 29.5% of those under age 18 and 7.7% of those age 65 or over.

Politics

Like many Appalachian counties, Jefferson County was a strong Democratic county in the 20th century. However, since the turn of the 21st century, it has become much more competitive and even moved towards the Republicans during the Democratic years of 2008 and 2012. In 2012, Mitt Romney became the first Republican candidate in four decades to win the county, since the county voted for President Nixon in the 1972 presidential election.

|}

Government

The following are the elected officials, judges, and representatives of Jefferson County as of the 2022 election cycle.

Jefferson County officials

Jefferson County judgeships

Ohio House of Representatives

Ohio State Senate

United States House of Representatives

United States Senate

Transportation
Commercial air service is available at nearby Pittsburgh International Airport to the east via U.S. Route 22.  The county is served by two general aviation fields, the Jefferson County Airpark and the Eddie Dew Memorial Airpark.

Ohio Route 7 is the main north–south highway through the county.

Education

Colleges and universities
 Franciscan University of Steubenville

Community, junior, and technical colleges
 Eastern Gateway Community College
 Trinity Health System School of Nursing

Public school districts

 Buckeye Local School District
 Edison Local School District
 Indian Creek Local School District
 Steubenville City School District
 Toronto City School District

High schools

 Buckeye Local High School
 Catholic Central High School
 Edison High School
 Indian Creek High School
 Jefferson County Christian School
 Steubenville High School
 Toronto High School

Communities

Cities
 Steubenville (county seat)
 Toronto

Villages

 Adena
 Amsterdam
 Bergholz
 Bloomingdale
 Dillonvale
 Empire
 Irondale
 Mingo Junction
 Mount Pleasant
 New Alexandria
 Rayland
 Richmond
 Smithfield
 Stratton
 Tiltonsville
 Wintersville
 Yorkville

Townships

 Brush Creek
 Cross Creek
 Island Creek
 Knox
 Mount Pleasant
 Ross
 Salem
 Saline
 Smithfield
 Springfield
 Steubenville
 Warren
 Wayne
 Wells

Census-designated places
 Brilliant
 Connorville
 East Springfield
 Pottery Addition

Unincorporated communities

 Alikanna
 Altamont
 Annapolis
 Belvedere
 Bradley
 Broadacre
 Calumet
 Chandler
 Circle Green
 Costonia
 Cream City
 Deandale
 Deyarmonville
 Dunglen
 Emerson
 Fairplay
 Fernwood
 Georges Run
 Gould
 Grandview Heights
 Greentown
 Hammondsville
 Herrick
 Holt
 Hopewell
 Jackson Heights
 Knoxville
 McConnelsville
 McIntyre
 Middleburg
 Monroeville
 New Somerset
 Newell
 Olszeski Town
 Osage
 Panhandle
 Parlett
 Piney Fork
 Port Homer
 Pravo
 Ramsey
 Reeds Mill
 Robyville
 Rush Run
 Shady Glen
 Unionport
 Warrenton
 Wolf Run
 Weems
 Yellow Creek
 York

Historical community
Carpenter's Fort, or Carpenter's Station as it was sometimes called, was established in the summer of 1781 when John Carpenter built a fortified house above the mouth of Short Creek on the Ohio side of the Ohio River in Coshocton County, but now in Jefferson County, Ohio, near Rayland, Ohio.

Population ranking
The population ranking of the following table is based on the 2010 census of Jefferson County.

* majority of municipality in Harrison County
** minority of municipality in Belmont County
† county seat

See also
 National Register of Historic Places listings in Jefferson County, Ohio

References

External links
 County website

 
Ohio counties
1797 establishments in the Northwest Territory
Appalachian Ohio
Counties of Appalachia
Ohio counties on the Ohio River
Populated places established in 1797